Somerset station is an elevated rapid transit station on SEPTA's Market–Frankford Line, located at the intersection of Somerset Street, D Street, and Kensington Avenue in the Kensington neighborhood of Philadelphia, Pennsylvania. The station is also served by SEPTA City Bus routes 3 and 54.

History
Somerset is part of the Frankford Elevated section of the line, which began service on November 5, 1922.

Between 1988 and 2003, SEPTA undertook a $493.3 million reconstruction of the  Frankford Elevated. Somerset station was completely rebuilt on the site of the original station; the project included new platforms, elevators, windscreens, and overpasses, and the station now meets ADA accessibility requirements. The line had originally been built with track ballast and was replaced with precast sections of deck, allowing the station (and the entire line) to remain open throughout the project.

In 2007, Philadelphia Weekly named intersection underneath the station as one of the top ten "drug corners" in the city.

During the Market–Frankford's rush-hour skip-stop service pattern, Somerset was only served by "B" trains. This practice was discontinued on February 24, 2020.

On March 21, 2021, Somerset station temporarily closed due to safety concerns. The station was closed so SEPTA can clean the station and repair elevators. The station experiences high drug use from patrons, with several people falling onto the tracks and the elevators broken because of human waste and needles. Somerset station reopened on April 5, 2021, and will have additional SEPTA Transit Police presence.

Station layout
Access to the station is at the southwest corner of Somerset Street and Kensington Avenue. There is also an exit-only staircase from the eastbound platform at the southeast corner of the intersection. West of the station, the tracks traverse a truss bridge over a Conrail freight line.

References

External links

Images at NYCSubway.org
Station entrance from Google Maps Street View
Station exit from Google Maps Street View

SEPTA Market-Frankford Line stations
Railway stations in Philadelphia
Railway stations in the United States opened in 1922